Allentown may refer to several places in the United States and topics related to them:

Allentown, California, now called Toadtown, California
Allentown, Georgia, a city in four counties in Georgia
Allentown, Illinois, an unincorporated community in Tazewell County
Allentown, New Jersey, a borough in Monmouth County
Allentown, New York (disambiguation)
Allentown, a hamlet in the town of Alma, New York in Allegany County
Allentown, a hamlet in the town of Hadley, New York in Saratoga County
Allentown, Buffalo, a neighborhood in Buffalo, New York
Allentown, Ohio, an unincorporated community
Allentown, Allegheny County, Pennsylvania, a suburb of Pittsburgh, Pennsylvania
Allentown, Pennsylvania, a city in eastern Pennsylvania
Allentown-Bethlehem-Easton metropolitan area, a metropolitan area also known as the Lehigh Valley
"Allentown" (song), by American singer Billy Joel (1982) about Allentown, Pennsylvania
"Allentown Jail", a folk-style song written by American Irving Gordon
Allentown Ambassadors (1997-2003), a defunct independent baseball team
Allentown Jets (1958-1981), a defunct minor league basketball team
Allentown, Washington, a neighborhood in Tukwila, Washington

See also
Allen (disambiguation)
Allenton (disambiguation)
Allensworth (disambiguation)
Allenstown (disambiguation)